Denise Joaquin (born Angelica Domingo) is a Filipino actress.

Career
Joaquin started as a contract actor of Premiere Productions for which she did three movies Nagmumurang Kamatis, Anak ng Bulkan and Matrikula. She signed up with ABS-CBN's Talent Center (now Star Magic) when Premiere Productions closed and her three-year six-picture contract lapsed. She was one of the new actors launched as a member of Star Circle batch 6.

Personal life
Joaquin is related to amateur basketball player Kiefer Ravena. She is close friends with Jodi Sta. Maria. She previously dated Justin Cuyugan and Steven Alonso.

Joaquin identifies as Christian.

Filmography

Television

Film

References

External links

Star Magic
Filipino television actresses
ABS-CBN personalities
Living people
Filipino film actresses
Year of birth missing (living people)